The 2015–16 Slovenian Basketball League was the 25th season of the Premier A Slovenian Basketball League. On March 24, 2016, league got new sponsorship name, Liga Nova KBM.

The defending champions were Tajfun. From 2. SKL were promoted Škofja Loka and additionally Lastovka, because Grosuplje withdrew from the league. Maribor also withdrew from the league due to bankruptcy.

Format
League consisted of 12 teams, but only nine started the first half of the season, because Olimpija, Krka, and Tajfun played in the regional ABA League and joined the competition in the second half. In the first half of the season, nine teams played each other twice, home and away. First three teams advanced to the second round, where they were joined by three teams competing in the regional league.

Teams

On July 24, 2015 list of teams for 2015–16 season was announced.

Personnel and kits

Managerial changes

Regular season

Second round

Group A

|}

Group B
Results between teams in the regular season remained in effect for the second round for Group B.

|}

Playoffs

The Playoffs began on Thursday, May 11, 2016 and concluded at June 5, 2016.

Relegation Playoffs
The two bottom teams of the season played against the two best teams from the Slovenian Second Division. All teams played each other at home and away.

|}

Awards

Regular Season MVP
 Smiljan Pavič (Šenčur)

Season MVP
 Jan Barbarič (Portorož)

Finals MVP
 Marjan Čakarun (Helios Suns)

Weekly MVP

Regular season

Note

 – Co-MVP's were announced.

Second round

Note

 – Co-MVP's were announced.

Statistical leaders

| width=50% valign=top |

Points

|}
|}

| width=50% valign=top |

Assists

|}
|}

References

Slovenian Basketball League seasons
Slovenia
1